Veli Leskinen (born 5 May 1907, date of death unknown) was a Finnish footballer. He played in twenty matches for the Finland national football team from 1932 to 1943. He was also part of Finland's squad for the football tournament at the 1936 Summer Olympics, but he did not play in any matches.

References

External links
 

1907 births
Year of death missing
Finnish footballers
Finland international footballers
Place of birth missing
Association football defenders